Gilmar Eduardo Napa Caiceido (born 5 January 2003) is an Ecuadorian footballer who plays as a goalkeeper for Ecuadorian Serie A club Emelec and the Ecuador national under-20 football team.

Early life
Napa is from Machala in the El Oro Province of Ecuador. Napa joined the football academy at Orense S.C. in 2015.

Career

Orense S.C.
Napa made his Ecuadorian Serie A league debut for Orense on 21 November, 2021 against L.D.U. Quito. He also played in September and October of 2022, first at Universidad Católica and then against Delfin after first-choice goalkeeper Rolando Silva was sent off and suspended.

S.C. Emelec
Napa joined Emelec ahead of the 2023 season, signing a four-year contract with the club. He was signed to challenge Pedro Ortiz for the number one jersey.

International career

U20 Ecuador
Napa played at the 2023 South American U-20 Championship for Ecuador where they secured qualification for the 2023 FIFA U-20 World Cup to be held in Indonesia. Napa was named in the team of the tournament by Brazilian newspaper AS.

Senior Ecuador team
In November 2022 Napa was called up to the senior Ecuador national football team for the first time as they prepared for a friendly match against Iraq on November 12, 2022.

References

External links

2003 births
Living people
People from Machala
People from El Oro Province
Ecuadorian footballers
Association football goalkeepers 
Orense S.C. players
C.S. Emelec footballers
Ecuadorian Serie A players